Ascent the Wind is a public artwork by American artist Michael Helbing. The artwork is located in the ARTSPARK grounds of the Indianapolis Art Center, in Indianapolis, Indiana, United States. While the Indianapolis Art Center titles it Ascent the Wind, the artist calls it Ascend the Wind.

Description

Ascent the Wind is an abstract stainless steel sculpture that rests on a concrete base. The artwork curves upwards and shifts in a flowing manner as tentacle-like appendages form off the top section seeming to blow in the wind.

Acquisition

The artwork is on temporary from the Shimmery Gallery and is listed at costing $40,000 for permanent purchase.

References

Indianapolis Art Center artworks
Outdoor sculptures in Indianapolis
Steel sculptures in Indiana
2004 sculptures
Stainless steel sculptures in the United States
Abstract sculptures in Indiana